Nazo may refer to:

Nazo (album), a 1997 album of Japanese singer Miho Komatsu
"Nazo" (song)
Nazo (actor), Afghan actor in Pekhawaray Mardanay